This is list of archives in Chile.

Archives in Chile 
 National Archives of Chile
 Archivo General de Asuntos Indígenas

See also 

 List of archives
 List of museums in Chile
 Culture of Chile
 Portal de Archivos Españoles (federated search of archives in Spain)

External links 
 General Archives (all)
  (video)

 
Archives
Chile
Archives